The IEEE Communications Magazine is a monthly magazine published by the IEEE Communications Society dealing with all areas of communications including light-wave telecommunications, high-speed data communications, personal communications systems (PCS), ISDN, and more. It includes special features, technical articles, book reviews, conferences, short courses, standards, governmental regulations and legislation, new products, and Society news. The magazine is published as IEEE Communications Magazine since 1979, replacing the IEEE Communications Society Magazine (1977-1978) and the Communications Society (1973-1976). According to the Journal Citation Reports, the magazine has a 2013 impact factor of 4.460. It is abstracted and indexed in most of the major bibliographic databases. The current editor-in-chief is Tarek S. El-Bawab.

Editors
 Tarek S. El-Bawab (Jackson State University), 2018-present
 Osman Gebizlioglu (Huawei Technologies), 2015-2017
 Sean Moore (Centripetal Networks), 2013-2014
 Steve Gorshe (PMC-Sierra, Inc.), 2010-2012
 Nim K. Cheung (Telcordia Tech., Inc.), -2009

References

External links
 

Communications Magazine
Telecommunications engineering